Ioana Loredana Roșca and Kimberley Zimmermann were the defending champions but chose not to participate.

Yuriko Miyazaki and Prarthana Thombare won the title, defeating Alicia Barnett and Olivia Nicholls in the final, 6–3, 6–3.

Seeds

Draw

Draw

References
Main Draw

Engie Open de l'Isère - Doubles